The 2008 Icelandic Men's Football League Cup was the 13th season of the Icelandic Men's League Cup, a pre-season professional football competition in Iceland. The competition started on 22 February 2008 and concluded on 1 May 2008. Valur beat Fram 4–1 in the final to win their first League Cup title.

The 24 teams were divided into 4 groups of 6 teams. Every team played every other team of its group once, either home or away. Top 2 teams from each group qualified for the quarter-finals.

Group stage
The games were played from 22 February to 15 April 2008.

Group 1

Group 2

Group 3

Group 4

Knockout stage

Quarter-finals

Semi-finals

Final

Top goalscorers
10 goals
 Tryggvi Guðmundsson (FH)

7 goals
 Dennis Bo Mortensen (Valur)

6 goals
 Almarr Ormarsson (KA)
 Helgi Sigurðsson (Valur)

5 goals
 Prince Rajcomar (Breiðablik)
 Björgólfur Hideaki Takefusa (KR)
 Gudjon Baldvinsson (KR)
 Daníel Hjaltason (Valur)
 Pálmi Rafn Pálmason (Valur)

4 goals
 Andri Steinn Birgisson (Grindavík)
 Patrik Redo (Keflavík)
 Alfred Elias Johannsson (Víkingur Ólafsvík)

External links
 Deildabikar on rsssf.com

2008 in Icelandic football
2008 domestic association football cups
Icelandic Men's Football League Cup